Prabhat Kumar Mishra is an Indian politician. He was elected to the Lok Sabha, lower house of the Parliament of India as a member of the Indian National Congress.

References

External links
 Official biographical sketch in Parliament of India website

India MPs 1984–1989
Lok Sabha members from Madhya Pradesh
1957 births
2004 deaths